Sav-A-Center was a trade name owned by The Great Atlantic & Pacific Tea Company.

History
The Sav-A-Center name was first used for a chain of 20 supermarkets in the greater New Orleans, Louisiana, area. The division operated throughout Louisiana, and had two stores in Mississippi. In addition, the Sav-A-Center division included three regular A&P stores, one of which was a small "corner grocery" in the French Quarter of New Orleans that A&P had been operating since 1931.

By August 2005, Sav-A-Center operated primarily in the Baton Rouge and New Orleans metropolitan areas, and along the Mississippi Gulf Coast. Many stores sustained damage as a result of Hurricane Katrina. Twenty-one stores reopened within a few months of the storm; two others following remodeling to repair flood damage. Five stores were closed permanently due to severe damage to the stores and surrounding areas. In April 2007, the chain exited the Baton Rouge area.

On May 30, 2007, A&P confirmed that it was planning to exit the New Orleans area, and was seeking buyers for its 20 remaining Sav-A-Center stores. A&P said the company cited its decision to focus on its remaining operations in the Northeast, where it operated the majority of its stores.  It was announced in September 2007 that the remaining Sav-A-Center stores would be sold to the locally owned Rouses chain. Rouses took over 16 Sav-A-Center stores, including the Mississippi stores and the French Quarter A&P, sold one to competing chain Breaux Mart, and closed the others.

A&P Sav-A-Center

The Sav-A-Center name was also added to many of A&P's Northeastern and mid-South Atlantic stores in the mid-1980s, shortly after A&P purchased most of Stop & Shop’s New York metro area stores following the chain’s exit from the market area. After the sale, A&P found itself sharing strip-mall space with many Bradlees stores, which at the time were owned by Stop & Shop, and in some cases the two chains shared a building in a manner not unlike today’s Walmart supercenters. When A&P took over the supermarkets, a common wall was built to separate the businesses. In many areas, including Tidewater region/Hampton Roads, Virginia, in North Carolina, plus most of A&P's Northeastern area, traditional A&P stores were remodeled as Sav-A-Centers; the classic A&P sign's red, orange, and yellow colors became shades of kelly green.

In the Northeast, the former Stop & Shop stores were larger than most of the traditional A&P stores. The company tried to use the Sav-A-Center conversion as a part of its "We've Built a Proud New Feeling" campaign, which was created to shed the company's high-price, stodgy perception. The campaign featured images of larger, cleaner, modern-style stores, happy, upscale-looking shoppers, and friendly, cooperative staff.  (It was during this time that A&P debuted its Futurestores.) The Sav-A-Center stores were renovated with oversized graphics of fresh-looking produce and baked goods; they also were outfitted with IBM-POS checkouts. However, A&P had trouble shedding its high-price perception; gradually, the low-volume Sav-A-Centers lost sales and shoppers to stores such as Pathmark (later a division of A&P) and NYC area-leader ShopRite (the Wakefern retailers' cooperative). Some of the stronger Sav-A-Centers survived, but many eventually closed, or were re-branded in the mid-to-late 1990s as A&P Food Market. A&P's southeastern and Carolina divisions were sold in 1998; some of the smaller New York metro-area stores that survived were rebranded beginning in 2001 as Food Basics.

Kohl's Sav-A-Center
After A&P purchased the Kohl's Food Stores chain, based in Wisconsin, some of those stores were re-branded as Kohl's Sav-A-Center. These stores were later re-branded as Kohl's Food Market or Kohl's Food Emporium before that chain went under.

Family Mart Sav-A-Center
In the 1980s and 1990s A&P rebranded many locations of its Southern United States The Family Mart chain as Family Mart Sav-A-Center.

Dominion Save-A-Centre
Beginning in the late 1980s, A&P Canada opened several stores in the Toronto area under the Save-A-Centre name. Its logo was the same as the American Save-A-Center, with the exceptions of being red rather than green, and Centre being the Canadian spelling of center. In the late 1990s, these stores were rebranded as Dominion Save-A-Centre (Dominion was another Canadian supermarket chain owned by A&P) and some remained in operation, eventually converted to Metro stores by 2009, following Metro's acquisition of A&P's Canadian properties, including Dominion.

Pathmark Sav-A-Center
A&P revived the Sav-A-Center name on newly remodeled Pathmark locations in New Dorp, New York, Irvington and  Edison, New Jersey; Upper Darby, Pennsylvania, and in three stores in Philadelphia. In addition, A&P's website rebranded Pathmark as Pathmark Sav-A-Center. here. Before being branded Pathmark Sav-A-Center, many of the chain's locations were branded Pathmark Super Center.

See also
List of Canadian supermarkets

References

External links
 Rouses Website

Defunct supermarkets of Canada
Supermarkets of the United States
The Great Atlantic & Pacific Tea Company